Masdar City is a planned city project in Abu Dhabi, in the United Arab Emirates. Its core is being built by Masdar, a subsidiary of Mubadala Development Company, with the majority of seed capital provided by the Government of Abu Dhabi. Designed by the British architectural firm Foster and Partners, the city relies on solar energy and other renewable energy sources.

The city will be connected to existing urban areas via roads and light-rail. Masdar City hosts the headquarters of the International Renewable Energy Agency (IRENA). The city is designed to be a hub for cleantech companies. Its first tenant was the Masdar Institute of Science and Technology, which has been operating in the city since it moved into its campus in September 2010.

Design and intent 
Masdar City is one of a small number of highly planned, specialised, research and technology-intensive municipalities that incorporate a living environment, similar to KAUST, Saudi Arabia or Tsukuba Science City, Japan.
The project is led by Masdar, a subsidiary of Mubadala Development Company.
Partners in the project through its Clean Tech Fund are Consensus Business Group, Credit Suisse and Siemens Venture Capital. Construction of the first phase of the project was to be managed by CH2M Hill. Infrastructure construction for the city was to be handled by the Al Jaber Group and design of the central Masdar headquarters building was awarded to Adrian Smith + Gordon Gill Architecture. The city's wayfinding system was developed by Endpoint and City ID.

Initiated in 2006, the city was envisioned to cover  and estimated to cost . The original plan was that it would take approximately eight years to build, with the first phase scheduled to be completed and habitable in 2009.

Construction began on Masdar City in February 2008 and the first six buildings of the city were completed and occupied in October 2010.  However, due to the impact of the global financial crisis, the initial  was estimated for completion in 2015; final completion was pushed back to between 2020 and 2025.  By 2016, less than  had been developed and final completion was estimated to be 2030. , a 2030 completion date was still projected.

The city is meant to be exemplary, focusing on sustainability while demonstrating greener urban living.
As designed, the city would be home to 45,000 to 50,000 people and 1,500 businesses, primarily commercial and manufacturing facilities specialising in environmentally friendly products. In turn, more than 60,000 workers are expected to commute to the city daily.
, fewer than 2,000 people are employed in Masdar, and only the 300 students of the Masdar Institute live on site.
 the areas that have been completed are only lightly occupied, home to an estimated 1,300 residents and another 4,000 office workers.

 ground-breaking occurred for a new expansion:  the Masdar City Square (MC2). The expansion is planned to cover 29,000 square meters with a  Gross Floor Area (GFA) of 50,000 square meters. It would involve the complex's first net-zero energy office building and six additional green buildings with certification at 4-Pearl Estidama, LEED Platinum, and WELL Gold levels. This expansion is projected to be completed in 2024. The expansion is part of the UAE's Net-Zero by 2050 Strategy.

Masdar City is meant to incorporate efficient water use into its design. To achieve this Masdar City will recycle water and maximize the use of said water. It will employ rainwater collection schemes, catch condensate and use acceptable waste water streams. Masdar City will attempt to incentivize behavioral changes to conserve potable water.

Architecture 
Masdar is a sustainable mixed-use development designed to be very friendly to pedestrians and cyclists.

Masdar City has terracotta walls decorated with arabesque patterns. From a distance, the city looks like a cube. The temperature in the streets is generally  cooler than the surrounding desert. The temperature difference is due to Masdar's unique construction. A  wind tower modelled on traditional Arab designs sucks air from above and pushes a cooling breeze through Masdar's streets. The site is raised above the surrounding land to create a slight cooling effect. Buildings are clustered close together to create streets and walkways shielded from the sun.

Masdar City was designed by Foster and Partners. Foster's design team started its work by touring ancient cities such as Cairo and Muscat to see how they kept cool. The buildings at the end of these streets create just enough wind turbulence to push air upwards, creating a flushing effect that cools the street.

Masdar City contains a tech park made from recycled standard 40 foot unit shipping containers.

Transport system 

The initial design banned automobiles, as travel will be accomplished via public mass transit and personal rapid transit (PRT) systems, with existing road and railways connecting to other locations outside the city.  The absence of motor vehicles coupled with Masdar's perimeter wall, designed to keep out the hot desert winds, allows for narrow and shaded streets that help funnel cooler breezes across the city. People as well as goods and supplies will be transported using the PRT.

In October 2010 it was announced the PRT would not expand beyond the pilot scheme due to the cost of creating the undercroft to segregate the system from pedestrian traffic. Subsequently, a test fleet of 10 Mitsubishi i-MiEV electric cars was deployed in 2011 as part of a one-year pilot to test point-to-point transportation for the city as a complement to the PRT and the freight rapid transit (FRT), both of which consist of automated electric-powered vehicles.

Under a revised design, public transport within the city will rely on methods other than the PRTs. Masdar will instead use a mix of electric vehicles and other clean-energy vehicles for mass transit inside the city. The majority of private vehicles will be restricted to parking lots along the city's perimeter. Abu Dhabi's planned but delayed light rail and metro line may eventually connect Masdar City's centre with the greater metropolitan area.  connections to beyond the city continue to be by car, as a projected light rail line does not yet exist.

Since 2018, as part of an ongoing trial, seven NAVYA Autonom fully autonomous shuttles carry passengers between the car park and the city centre.  A further route was due to open in 2019 that ran from the residential complex above the city's North Car Park to the headquarters of the International Renewable Energy Agency (IRENA) and the Majid Al Futtaim's My City Centre Masdar Shopping Mall.

Commercial tenants and population

Masdar Institute 
The Masdar Institute of Science and Technology is a graduate-level research university focused on alternative energy, environmental sustainability, and clean technology. Its campus is located in Masdar City. The Masdar Institute was Masdar City's first occupant.  The design of the campus emphasises flexibility, the use of traditional architectural elements, and modern materials to provide for an optimised combination of natural lighting and cooling that minimise energy needs. By 2013, 336 students were enrolled at the institute. These students were selected from more than 2,000 applicants. 42% of enrolled students are from the UAE and 35% are female.

The Masdar Institute plans to eventually enroll about 800 students. Admitted students from all countries are offered a full-tuition scholarships, monthly stipends, travel expenses, laptop computers, textbooks, and accommodation in order to facilitate their studies. Masdar students and faculty are engaged in over 300 joint projects with academia, private enterprise, and government agencies. Their research tends to focus on renewable energy, smart grids and smart buildings, energy policy and planning, water consumption, environmental engineering, and electronics.

The Masdar Institute has been behind the engineering plans of Masdar City and is at the center of research and development activities. The institute's building, developed in co-operation with the Massachusetts Institute of Technology, uses 51% less electricity and 54% less potable water than traditional buildings in the UAE, and is fitted with a metering system that constantly observes power consumption.

International Renewable Energy Agency 
Masdar City will host the headquarters of the International Renewable Energy Agency, commonly known as IRENA, the first intergovernmental organization in the Middle East. , construction of IRENA's headquarters was underway. Masdar was selected to host IRENA's headquarters after a high-profile campaign by the UAE. In its bid, the UAE offered rent-free offices in Masdar City, 20 IRENA scholarships to the Masdar Institute of Science and Technology, and up to US$350 million in loans for renewable energy projects in developing countries.

Siemens 
A regional headquarters for Siemens has been built in Masdar City. This building is the most energy efficient in all of Abu Dhabi. In 2014, more than 800 staff will start work there. The LEED Platinum building makes use of sustainable and energy efficient materials and building techniques. It was designed to use 45 percent less energy and 50 percent less water than typical office buildings. The Siemens headquarters won an award for best office building at the Mpim Architectural Review Future Projects Awards in 2012. The Middle East Architect Awards named it both the best and most sustainable office building the same year.

The  building is built around the idea of a "box within a box". The structure includes a highly insulated airtight inner façade that insulates from the sun and a lightweight aluminium shading system on the exterior. The plaza beneath the building is funnel-shaped. This shape works to suck prevailing winds underneath the building. Due to the Venturi effect, a breeze flows up to the roof of the building through atria in the buildings structure, cooling public spaces without energy costs. These atria also allow daylight into the centre of the building in order to reduce the need for artificial lighting, further reducing energy consumption. The building's automation systems are all from Siemens.

Siemens signed an initial ten-year lease.

Incubator Building 
The Incubator Building includes retail and office space to house start-ups, small-and-medium-sized enterprises, and regional offices for multinationals. The Incubator Building is designed to accommodate roughly fifty companies. Some of the most notable tenants include General Electric, Mitsubishi, Schneider Electric, and the Global Green Growth Institute. The Incubator Building is also home to the first LEED CI-certified office in Abu Dhabi, Alpin Limited.

The Incubator Building houses the General Electric Ecomagination Center. The center offers training and exhibitions on energy and water efficiency.

The Catalyst 
Masdar City partnered with BP, oil giant, to created 'The Catalyst'. This start up will support new and innovative companies which are 1–3 years away from commercialization of their products. , The Catalyst added three new companies which they were supporting through multiple facets. These include training and mentorship as well as funding. The Catalyst aims to attract companies focusing on green technology and they accept applications from local and international businesses and entrepreneurs.

Renewable resources 
The original master plan envisioned a city functioning on its own grid with full carbon neutrality.  However, the development was later hooked into the public system, and by 2016 its managers determined that the city would never reach net-zero carbon levels.

Masdar is powered by a  field of 87,777 solar panels with additional panels on roofs.

There are no light switches or water taps in the city; movement sensors control lighting and water to cut electricity and water consumption by 51 and 55 percent respectively. Gerard Evenden, the lead architect, says that the original plan for Masdar called for powering the entire city through on-site methods such as rooftop solar panels. He said,
"When we started this project, nobody had really looked at doing projects of this scale. Then you realise it's much more efficient to build your solar field on the ground in the middle of the desert. You can send a man to brush them off every day, rather than having to access everyone's buildings individually, and you can make sure that they are running at their absolute peak. It's much better than putting them on every building in the city."

Blowing sand has been a problem for its solar panels, so Masdar has been working with other companies to engineer surfaces with pores smaller than sand particles to stop them from sticking on the panels. Scientists at the Masdar Institute are also working on coatings that repel sand and bacteria for use on solar panels and in other applications.

Besides photovoltaics, concentrated solar power (CSP) plants are being explored. For example, so-called "beam down" CSP plants have been constructed to test the viability of use in the city.

Water management has been planned in an environmentally sound manner as well. Approximately 80 percent of the water used will be recycled and waste water will be reused "as many times as possible", with this greywater being used for crop irrigation and other purposes.

The exterior wood used throughout the city is palmwood, a sustainable hardwood-substitute developed by Pacific Green using plantation coconut palms that no longer bear fruit. Palmwood features include the entrance gates, screens and doors.

Reaction 
The project is supported by the global conservation charity World Wide Fund for Nature and the sustainability group Bioregional. In 2008, in response to the project's commitment to zero carbon, zero waste and other environmentally friendly goals, WWF and Bioregional endorsed Masdar City as an official One Planet Living Community.

The project is also supported by Greenpeace; however, they stress that there should be more focus on retrofitting existing cities to make them more sustainable rather than constructing new zero-carbon cities from scratch.

The US Government has supported the project. The US Department of Energy has signed a partnership agreement with the Masdar Group in a deal that will see the two organisations share expertise to support plans on zero-carbon cities.

The Alliance to Save Energy honoured Masdar City with a 2012 EE Visionary Award in recognition of the city's contributions to the advancement of energy efficiency.

Some skeptics are concerned that the city will be only symbolic for Abu Dhabi. In an interview in 2011, Geoffrey M. Heal, a professor at Columbia Business School in New York City and an expert in environmental economics, called Masdar "a gimmick, a way of attracting publicity and attention." Its use of solar energy is not a practical model for others to follow, Heal further noted, given that few places in the world enjoy as much year-round sunlight as the Persian Gulf.

Others have expressed concern that it may become just a luxury development for the wealthy.  Nicolai Ouroussoff wrote in The New York Times that Masdar is the culmination of the gated community concept: "the crystallization of another global phenomenon: the growing division of the world into refined, high-end enclaves and vast formless ghettos where issues like sustainability have little immediate relevance".

Gallery

See also
 Abrahamic Family House, another international center in Abu Dhabi
 Sustainable_city
 Sharjah Sustainable City

References

External links 

 

Buildings and structures under construction in Abu Dhabi
Planned cities in the United Arab Emirates
Foster and Partners buildings
Proposed populated places
Sustainable urban planning
Neighborhoods of Abu Dhabi
New towns started in the 2000s